Chitwan District is one of 77 districts of Nepal, and takes up the southwestern corner of Bagmati Province. Bharatpur, largest city of Nepal after Kathmandu, is its administrative centre. In 2011 it had a population of 579,984 (279,087 male and 300,897 female) people. In 2021 it had a population of 722,168 (354,071 male and 368,097 female) people. Bharatpur is the commercial and service centre of South Central Nepal and a major destination for higher education, health care and transportation in the region. Chitwan lies in the Terai region of Nepal. It is in the drainage basin of the Gandaki River and is roughly triangular, taking that river as its meandering northwestern border, and a modest watershed border, with India, as the basis of its southern limit.
Local government: Bharatpur Metropolitan, Rapti Municipality, Ratnanagar Municipality, Kalika Municipality, Madi Municipality, Ikshyakamana Gaupalika

History
The district takes its name from the Chitwan Valley, one of Nepal's Inner Terai valleys between the Mahabharat and Siwalik ranges, both considered foothills of the Himalayas.

Chitwan is one of the few remaining undisturbed vestiges of the Terai region, which formerly extended over the foothills of Nepal. It was originally a dense forest with wild animals like leopards and Bengal tigers. It was ruled by Chitrsen Baba and rishis meditated in the forest.  .

Etymology
There are several theories on the origin of the name Chitwan:

 The name Chitwan is a composite of the Sanskrit words चित्त, transliterated "citta" meaning heart, and वन, transliterated "vana" meaning jungle or forest. Thus, the meaning of Chitwan is Heart of the Jungle.
 Chitwan was a dense forest ruled by the Tharu God-King Chitrasen Baba, thought to an incarnation of Vishnu.  Today, the Tharu worship his idol during HariBodhini Ekadashi in Chitrasari en route to the village of Sauraha. Ban (वन) is the local word for a forest, according to this theory, the area was called Chitra Ban (Chitrasen's forest) which then became Chitwan.
 The Chitwan forests were populated by leopards and Bengal tigers and, since the Tharu term for a leopard is Chitri, the area became Chitwan.
 Chitra is also the Tharu word for religious drawings and, hence, "Chitra ban" became Chitwan.

Religious Sites
 Valmiki Ashram
  
 Shivaghat
 Devghat
 Bikram-Baba Temple
 Krishna Mandir Temple

Agriculture and industry
The people inhabiting the Chitwan District are predominantly peasant farmers cultivating mainly food and cash crops such as rice, maize, wheat, beans, lentils, mustard and Vegetables. Maize is cultivated on irrigated /seasonal irrigated land in winter and spring, and on rain fed land in summer. Because it is easily accessible by good roads, maize produced in the district can be easily distributed to other parts of the country. Poultry is also a significant industry in Chitwan.

Chitwan is famous in Nepal for mustard growing and production of mustard oil. This popularity of the mustard in Chitwan is attributed to the predominant soil type silt, resulting from the flooding of the Narayani River and its tributaries. The land of Chitwan is also spotted with clay, which is very good for growing rice, wheat and vegetables such as cabbage, cauliflower, radish, potatoes, broccoli, cucumbers, pumpkins, sweet potatoes and carrot. Chitwan is also famous for floriculture, mushroom cultivation and bee keeping.

Chitwan has adopting the South Korean New Community Movement model of development. One of the biggest rice mills in Nepal, Agam Food Industry, is situated in Bharatpur and is a big source of local employment.

Cuisine
Chitwan is known for Taas, a spicy fried goat meat dish served with bhuja or cheura. Momos, Bhuteko Bhat (fried rice), and sukuti are other popular dishes. Dal bhat (steamed rice and lentils),  is the staple food of the area, though meat and dairy products are also consumed. Other popular cuisines include Newari and Tharu and Thakali. For centuries, traditional fermented foods and beverages have constituted about 20% of the local diet. Depending on altitudinal variation, finger millet, wheat, buckwheat, barley, vegetable, rice, potato, and soybeans etc. are grown.

Gallery

Geography
The Rapti River flows east to the southwest in the south of Bharatpur and forms the northern border of the Chitwan National Park. The Narayani River flows north to south to the west of Bharatpur. It is the deepest and one of the biggest rivers in Nepal. The Narayani Bridge over the river connects Chitwan District with Nawalparasi District of Nepal.

Chitwan is particularly rich in flora and fauna. Nepal's first national park, the Chitwan National Park together with the adjacent Parsa National Park support a diversity of species that is much higher than elsewhere on the Indian subcontinent. Rare species include Bengal tiger, gharial, rhino, leopards, mugger crocodile, Indian rock python and several species of deer. The protected areas are guarded by a battalion of the Nepal Army and patrolled by anti-poaching units. The lake is an important bird-watching center.

Krishna Mandir is One of the nice temples of the Hindu religion of Nepal. This is the temple of the god Krishna. There is no statue of the god in this temple. Its interior is made of mirrors all over the wall. The historical event of the god Krishna is shown on the wall. There is one place inside where there is a statue of the god Krishna and his wife.

Transportation and communication

Bharatpur Airport is the only airport in the region and has flights to and from Kathmandu. Mahendra Highway, the main east–west highway in Nepal, runs through the region and, Prithvi Highway a north–south highway from the border with India to Kathmandu runs through the district. Narayangarh is the main transit point for vehicles travelling via the east–west Mahendra Highway and also for people travelling from Kathmandu, Gorkha, and Pokhara through Mugling.

There are numerous local FM radio stations broadcasting from Bharatpur: Synergy FM,  Hamro FM, Radio Triveni, Radio Madi, Radio Chitwan, Radio Kotagiri, Chitwan Online FM, Kalika Music FM, Kalika FM. and Narayani FM. Television channels include Beso Channel, Aviyan Channel, Unique Television and Avass Television. There are multiple private Internet service providers. Fibre connectivity and 4G internet is available in the larger cities.

Landmark buildings
 Upardanghari fort, in the old headquarters of Chitwan district,  is believed to have been built by Satrubhanjan Shah, the son of Prince Bahadur Shah to defend the newly founded Kingdom in the 17th century. 
 Kasara Durbar is an old palace built by the Rana Regime inside Chitwan National Park. Currently, it serves as the park office and museum.
 Diyalo Bangala Palace (Aptari Bharatpur) was the spring season palace used by the Shah Dynasty of Nepal. This palace was built by late king Mahendra Bir Bikram Shahdev to rest in during winter season. It is located on the banks of Narayani River in Bharatpur Municipality ward no. 2.
 DAO Building Bharatpur: This old building was built in the period of shifting the headquarters from Upardangghari.  Now is used as an office of the chief district officer.
 Bharatpur Covered hall: Hall in guesthouse of Bharatpur for indoor games.

Geography and climate

Major places

Ayodhyapuri
 Dibyanagar
Bharatpur
Narayangarh Bazaar
Tandi bazaar
Parsa Bazaar
Parsadhap Bazaar
Birendranagar Bazaar
Muglin Bazaar
Rampur Bazaar
Gitanagar bazaar
Bhandara Bazaar
Chanauli Bazaar
Mangalpur Bazaar
Manakamana
Shivanagar bazaar
Basantapur Bazaar, Madi
Patihani bazaar
Parbatipur Bazaar
Saradanagar bazaar
Jagatpur Bazaar
Meghauli-Telauli Bazaar
Lothar Bazaar
Sauraha
Kasara
Dasdhunga
Krishna Mandir
Badgaun
Jhuwani
Gawai
Bairiya
Kumroj

Demographics
At the time of the 2011 Nepal census, Chitwan District had a population of 579,984. Of these, 70.1% spoke Nepali, 10.3% Tharu, 4.8% Tamang, 3.7% Chepang, 2.9% Gurung, 1.6% Bhojpuri, 1.6% Magar, 1.6% Newari, 1.2% Darai, 0.6% Maithili, 0.5% Hindi, 0.3% Bote, 0.2% Urdu, 0.1% Rai and 0.1% other languages as their first language.

In terms of ethnicity/caste, 28.7% were Hill Brahmin, 11.2% Chhetri, 11.0% Tharu, 7.9% Tamang, 6.8% Gurung, 5.2% Newar, 5.0% Chepang/Praja, 4.9% Kami, 4.8% Magar, 2.1% Damai/Dholi, 1.6% Kumal, 1.4% Darai, 1.2% Musalman, 1.2% Sarki, 0.8% Gharti/Bhujel, 0.7% Rai, 0.6% Sanyasi/Dasnami, 0.6% Thakuri, 0.5% Bote, 0.3% Teli, 0.2% Danuwar, 0.2% Ghale, 0.2% Kalwar, 0.2% Kanu, 0.2% Kathabaniyan, 0.2% Koiri/Kushwaha, 0.2% Yadav, 0.1% Badi, 0.1% other Dalit, 0.1% Dura, 0.1% Dusadh/Pasawan/Pasi, 0.1% Gaine, 0.1% Hajam/Thakur, 0.1% Halwai, 0.1% Kurmi, 0.1% Limbu, 0.1% Majhi, 0.1% Mallaha, 0.1% Marwadi, 0.1% Musahar, 0.1% Sunuwar, 0.1% other Terai and 0.1 others.

In terms of religion, 81.4% were Hindu, 13.0% Buddhist, 3.4% Christian, 1.2% Muslim, 0.6% Prakriti and 0.3% others.

In terms of literacy, 76.6% could read and write, 2.0% could only read and 21.3% could neither read nor write.

Administration
The district consists of seven municipalities, out of which one is a metropolitan city, five are urban municipalities and one is a rural municipality.

Bharatpur Metropolitan City
Kalika Municipality
Khairahani Municipality
Madi Municipality
Ratnanagar municipality
Rapti Municipality
Ichchhakamana Rural Municipality

Former municipalities and gaunpalikas 

Prior to the restructuring of the district, Chitwan had following Rural Municipality and municipalities.

Ayodhyapuri
Bagauda
Bharatpur Metropolitan
Chandi Bhanjyang
Dahakhani
Gardi
Kalika Municipality
Kabilas
Kathar
Kaule
Khairhani municipality
Korak
Kumroj
Lothar
Madi Municipality
Madi Kalyanpur
Mangalpur
Narayanpur
Piple
Ratnanagar municipality
Rapti Municipality
Siddi

Health care
Chitwan district is known for its hospitals and has many top rated medical institutions, mostly in and around Bharatpur Municipality.Bharatpur is colloquially known as medical city of Nepal. The district is especially known for the B. P. Koirala Memorial Cancer Hospital at Krishnapur and two of the reputed medical colleges of the nation;College of Medical Sciences, Bharatpur and Chitwan Medical College. Chitwan ranks only behind the capitalKathmandu, in terms of hospital facilities in Nepal. Medical facilities in the district also include Bharatpur Hospital, a part of the Bharatpur medical college; Chitwan Eye Hospital; Sairam Dental Hospital and Research Center; Maula Kalika Hospital; and Narayani Community Hospital.

Educational institutions 
Most of the Educational institutions in this region provides quality education to the students from Chitwan and neighboring districts too . These schools and colleges focuses on the development of skills and knowledge of their students.

Below there are the name of some of those Schools:

 Prembasti Secondary  School, Bharatpur 7 prembasti
  Shree Sharadpur Higher School

 Little Stars Secondary English Boarding School. Bharatpur 7, Krishnapur.
 SOS Hermann Gmeiner School Bharatpur, Bharatpur-8, Chitwan
Holy Vision Public School, Yagyapuri, Bharatpur-4
 Grandee English Boarding School, Bharatpur-19
 Shanti Vidya Mandir English School, Bharatpur-11, Chitwan
 Sirjana English Secondary School, Located behind Central Bus Terminal (Paras Buspark)
 Boston International College, Hakim chowk, Bharatpur-10 (affiliated to Pokhara University)
 School of Health Science
Chitwan Higher Secondary School, Bharatpur-10
 Sun Rise English school, Bharatpur 10.
 Pragati Shiksha Sadan, East Rampur, Chitwan.
 Jana Jagriti Higher Secondary School, Pithuwa – 3, Pithuwa
 Sagarmatha Secondary Boarding School, Ratnanagar
 Aroma Higher Secondary School
Birendra Multiple Campus is the oldest campus of the city, located in Bharatpur heights.
 Lead Academy for Science and Management Technology
Institute of Agriculture and Animal Science, also known as the Rampur Agriculture Campus, is the agriculture institution under Tribhuvan University, and is the main institution in the fields of agriculture and veterinary science in Nepal. Occupying a huge area, this campus has been declared a university, the Agriculture and Forestry University.
Balkumari College is located near the Narayangadh Bharatpur Height and affiliated to Tribhuvan University.
Saptagandaki Multiple Campus is the largest public campus in the city, located in Dipendranagar ward no. 10, Bharatpur.
 Jan Aadrash multiple campus Birendranagar is the public campus in Birendranagar ward no. 2.
 Saheed Smriti Multiple campus, Shantichowk is the biggest campus of eastern Chitwan.
 Birendra higher secondary school
 College of Medical Sciences, Bharatpur is a 700-bed teaching hospital situated in Dipendranagar, Bharatpur.
 International college is a college of higher education and runs the HSEB and TU affiliated BBS and MBS programs in management streams.
 Apex Educational Academy is a higher secondary school in Bharapur.
 Valmiki Shiksha Sadan Higher Secondary School provides higher secondary education.
 Shree Medical and Technical College located in Bharatpur is affiliated to the Purbanchal University and CTEVT.
 Chitwan Health Foundation and Research Center was established in Bharatpur as the nursing School of Chitwan Hospital and Health Foundation
 Maiya Devi Girls College, located in Dipendranagar, Bharatpur.
 Chitwan Medical College and Research Centre, located in Dipendranagar, Bharatpur.
 Prerana Higher Secondary School
 SOS Hermann Gmeiner Higher Secondary School
 Chitwan Science College and Orchid Science College
 Indreni ICT college, affiliated to Tribhuvan University, located at Muktinagar, Bharatpur.
 Chitwan Hotel Training Center in Bharatpur
 Shree Prembasti Higher Secondary School, Bharatpur-7, Chitwan.
 Apex academy in Kshetrapur, Presidency college in Dipendranagar, Shanti Academy college in Bharatpur, Xavier college in Bel chowk, Sahid Smriti Multiple Campus, New Capital College, Crystal College in Ratnanagar
 Sun Rise English School
 Kamal Devi English School
 Sainik Awashiya Mahavidhyalaya Chitwan operated by Nepal army welfare fund provided education in high school level.
Buddha Shanti Higher Secondary School, Rapti Municipality 03.
 Little Flower English school, Belchowk
 Kalika English Boarding School
 Central English Boarding School
 Balikumari College
 Small heaven School
 Nepal Police School Bharatpur-14
 Aadikabi Bhanubhakta Secondary School, Narayangarh, bharatpur - 1
 Kankali Secondary School, Khairahani - 1
 Daisy English Higher Secondary Boarding School, Khairahani - 4, Parsa
 Paragon Secondary School, Ratnanagar-10, Chitwan
 Someshwor higher  secondary school Madi-01 Baruwa
 Madi secondary school, Madi-3 Basantapur
 Gawai Secondary School, Khairahani 13, Gawai
 Vijaya English Boarding School, Bharatpur-16, Bijayanagar
 Shree Durga Sheshkanta Adhikari Secondary School

Notable people
 Pushpa Kamal Dahal (Prachanda): Prime Minister of Nepal 2008–09, 2016–17 and incumbent since 26 December 2022; chairman of UCPN
 Nilkantha Upreti: Former Chief Election Commissioner of Nepal
 Surendra Pandey: Former Finance Minister of Nepal
 Ram Bahadur Thapa (Badal): Former Home Minister of Nepal
 Shristi Shrestha: Miss Nepal 2012
 Shiva Regmi: Nepalese Film director
 Bodhraj Acharya: Nepalese scientist
 Kamal Bahadur Adhikari: Nepalese weightlifter
 Dr. Santosh Kalwar: Nepalese poet, writer, and computer researcher (first English language novelist of Chitwan)
 Swopnil Sharma: Lead singer of The Shadows Nepal Band
 Sandeep Lamichhane: Cricketer
 Asmi Shrestha: Miss Nepal 2016
 Nirmal Purja: Nepalese Mountaineer
 Lalmani Chaudhary : 2008 House of representatives from Chitwan 1 (constituency)

See also
Ayodhyapuri

References

External links

 

 
Districts of Bagmati Province
Districts of Nepal established during Rana regime or before